Kebelj is a village in the Municipality of Slovenska Bistrica in northeastern Slovenia. It lies in the Pohorje Hills, north of Oplotnica. The area is part of the traditional region of Styria. It is now included with the rest of the municipality in the Drava Statistical Region.

The parish church in the settlement is dedicated to Saint Margaret and belongs to the Roman Catholic Archdiocese of Maribor. It dates to the late 14th century, with numerous later adaptations.

References

External links
Kebelj at Geopedia

Populated places in the Municipality of Slovenska Bistrica